Diāna Marcinkēviča was the defending champion, but she lost in qualifying. 

Elise Mertens won the title, defeating Amandine Hesse in the final, 6–4, 6–3.

Seeds

Main draw

Finals

Top half

Bottom half

References 
 Main draw

Abierto Victoria - Singles